Ferenc Gyurkovics  is a Hungarian weightlifter who competed for Hungary. He won the Silver medal in  Weightlifting at the 2004 Summer Olympics – Men's 105 kg  but was disqualified after he tested positive for stanazolol after a dope test.

References 

Hungarian male weightlifters
Olympic weightlifters of Hungary
Weightlifters at the 2004 Summer Olympics
Hungarian sportspeople in doping cases
1979 births
Doping cases in weightlifting
Living people
Competitors stripped of Summer Olympics medals
Sportspeople from Pécs
20th-century Hungarian people
21st-century Hungarian people